The 1996 season was São Paulo's 67th season since club's existence.

Statistics

Scorers

Overall

{|class="wikitable"
|-
|Games played || 69 (30 Campeonato Paulista, 2 Copa Masters CONMEBOL, 3 Copa do Brasil, 2 Copa de Oro, 23 Campeonato Brasileiro, 2 Supercopa Libertadores, 7 Friendly match)
|-
|Games won || 35 (16 Campeonato Paulista, 2 Copa Masters CONMEBOL, 2 Copa do Brasil, 1 Copa de Oro, 9 Campeonato Brasileiro, 1 Supercopa Libertadores, 4 Friendly match)
|-
|Games drawn || 19 (7 Campeonato Paulista, 0 Copa Masters CONMEBOL, 1 Copa do Brasil, 0 Copa de Oro, 8 Campeonato Brasileiro, 0 Supercopa Libertadores, 3 Friendly match)
|-
|Games lost || 15 (7 Campeonato Paulista, 0 Copa Masters CONMEBOL, 0 Copa do Brasil, 1 Copa de Oro, 6 Campeonato Brasileiro, 1 Supercopa Libertadores, 0 Friendly match)
|-
|Goals scored || 130
|-
|Goals conceded || 85
|-
|Goal difference || +45
|-
|Best result || 7–3 (H) v Botafogo - Copa Masters CONMEBOL - 1996.02.08
|-
|Worst result || 0–5 (H) v Corinthians - Campeonato Paulista - 1996.03.10
|-
|Most appearances || 
|-
|Top scorer || Valdir Bigode (31)
|-

Friendlies

Copa dos Campeões Mundiais

Official competitions

Campeonato Paulista

First round

Matches

Second round

Matches

Final standings

Record

Copa Masters CONMEBOL

Record

Copa do Brasil

Round of 32

Eightfinals

Record

Copa de Oro

Record

Campeonato Brasileiro

First stage

Matches

Record

Supercopa Sudamericana

Record

External links
official website 

São Paulo
São Paulo FC seasons